Major General Hassan Ghazi (9 July 1959 –  1 March 1984) was an Iranian footballer who was captain of Sepahan and was the main architect of the Iranian missile system in the Islamic Revolutionary Guard Corps during Iran–Iraq War.

Biography
Ghazi was born on 9 July 1959 in Isfahan. After graduating from high school, Ghazi went to Isfahan University of Medical Sciences.

Club career
He was captain of the Sepahan under-23 team. In 1974, he was considered one of the best Iranian players despite his age. Due to his talent, young age, and impressive performances, he was transferred to Iran under-23 team.

As developer of Iran's missile program
Ghazi took part in the 1979 Iranian Islamic Revolution. He had important roles in the Iran-Iraq war in the establishment of the first artillery and of the missile command center in AGIR.

Death
On 1 March 1984, Ghazi was killed during Operation Kheibar at the age of 24.

Legacy
Ghazi Stadium, Ghazi Military base and Ghazi Bridge in Isfahan are named after him.

In popular culture
Shaghayeghe Ashegh(fa: شقایق عاشق) (27 January 2014), ed. Zeynan Ataee, Isfahan: Setaregane Derakhshan; consisted of brief biographies of Hassan Ghazi and a collection of memories of officers and other people about them.

See also
 List of Iranian commanders in the Iran–Iraq War

Notes

References

External links
 کنگره ملی شهید حسن غازی و یک هزار و 86شهید ورزشکار استان اصفهان برگزار شد
 Cultural and artistic institution of Shohadae Ghadir 

Iranian footballers
Sepahan S.C. footballers
Sportspeople from Isfahan
1959 births
1984 deaths
Islamic Revolutionary Guard Corps personnel of the Iran–Iraq War
Iranian military personnel killed in the Iran–Iraq War
Association footballers not categorized by position
20th-century Iranian people